Marion Cunningham (née Kelp) is a fictional character in the 1970s American television sitcom Happy Days. She was played by Marion Ross, after whom the character was named, and first appears in the Love American Style episode "Love and the Happy Days". She is one of three characters to remain on the show for all 11 seasons. She is also one of three characters to be played by the same actors on Love American Style as well as Happy Days (the others being Richie and Potsie).

Bio
Marion Cunningham is the wife of Howard Cunningham and the mother of Richie, Joanie, and (briefly) Chuck Cunningham; she sometimes plays the role of a surrogate mother to Fonzie, who usually called her "Mrs. C". She is a housewife and does what housewife stereotypes normally do: cooking, cleaning, and looking after the kids while her husband is at work.

Marion once became frustrated by her life as a housewife and fell out with Howard about it. Fonzie encouraged her to work at Arnold's as a waitress but she insulted Al's menu and interfered with people's orders (see "Marion Rebels" from Season 4).

Marion became worried that Howard would leave her for a younger woman after she found out that one of her friends left his wife for a younger woman. She tries to prove to him that she is still young at heart but she goes completely over the top, Salome-style (see "Marion's Misgivings" from Season 5).

Marion once went to jail after crashing Howard's beloved DeSoto into Arnold's (see "Marion Goes to Jail" from Season 7).

References

Happy Days characters
Fictional characters from Milwaukee
Television characters introduced in 1972